Clyde is a given name. Notable people with this name include:

 Clyde Arbuckle (1903–1998), American historian
 Clyde Barrow (1909–1934), of the infamous American criminal duo Bonnie and Clyde
 Clyde Beatty (1903–1965), American animal trainer and circus impresario
 Clyde F. Bel Jr. (c. 1932–2014), American politician
 Clyde Bernhardt (1905–1986), American jazz trumpeter
 Clyde Bruckman (1894–1955), American screenwriter and film director
 Clyde Cameron (1913–2008), Australian politician
 Clyde Drexler (born 1962), American basketball player
 Clyde Edwards-Helaire (born 1999), American football player
 Clyde Fitch (1865–1909), American dramatist
 Clyde Geronimi (1901–1989), Italian-American animation director
 Clyde Lee Giles, American computer scientist
 Clyde H. Hamilton (1934–2020), American judge
 Clyde Holding (1931–2011), Australian politician
 Clyde Howdy (1921–1969), American actor and stuntman
 Clyde A. Hutchison III, American biochemist and microbiologist
 Clyde King (1924–2010), American baseball pitcher
 Clyde Kluckhohn (1905–1960), American  anthropologist
 Clyde Kusatsu (born 1948), Japanese-American actor
 Clyde Lovellette (1929–2016), American basketball player
 Clyde A. Lynch (1891–1950), American pastor, professor, and president of Lebanon Valley College 
 Clyde McCoy (1903–1990), American jazz trumpeter
 Clyde McPhatter (1932–1972), American R&B singer
 Clyde Milan (1887–1953), American baseball player
 Clyde Otis (1924–2008), American songwriter
 Clyde Packer (1935–2001), Australian businessman and politician
 Clyde Reasinger (1927–2018), American jazz trumpeter
 Clyde Sefton (born 1951), Australian road cyclist
 Clyde Stacy (1936–2013), American singer
 Clyde E. Stone (1876–1948), American jurist
 Clyde Sukeforth (1901–2000), American baseball pitcher
 Clyde Summers (1918–2010), American labor lawyer and law professor at the University of Pennsylvania Law School
 Clyde A. Thomason (1914–1942), U.S. Marine and posthumous Medal of Honor recipient
 Clyde Tolson, (1900–1975), Associate Director of the FBI
 Clyde Tombaugh (1906–1997), American astronomer, discoverer of Pluto
 Clyde A. Vaughn (born 1946), United States Army general
 Clyde De Vinna (1890–1953), American film cinematographer, winner for "White Shadows on the South Seas" in 1929
 Clyde Walcott (1926–2006), West Indian cricketer
 Clyde Kirby Wells (born 1937), Canadian Queen's Counsel, the fifth Premier of Newfoundland
 Clyde Wright (born 1941), American baseball player
 Clyde Zoia (1896–1955), American football player
 Clyde (turkey), a turkey annually pardoned on Thanksgiving by the governor of Alabama
 Colin Campbell, 1st Baron Clyde (1792–1863), British soldier and administrator
 Walt Frazier (born 1945), American basketball player nicknamed "Clyde"

Fictional characters 
 Clyde Crashcup, character from The Alvin Show
 Clyde Donovan, character from the television show South Park
 Clyde Langer, character from the television show The Sarah Jane Adventures
 Clyde McBride, character from the television show The Loud House
 Clyde, one of the members of Tori Amos' American Doll Posse
 Clyde the orangutan from Every Which Way but Loose
 Clyde, the orange (sometimes red) ghost in the Pac-Man series
 Clyde, an animated mobster inspired by Clyde Barrow who led the Ant Hill Mob in Wacky Races and The Perils of Penelope Pitstop
 Clyde, a character from Tom & Jerry Kids
 Clyde (mascot), the official mascot of the 2014 Commonwealth Games
 Clyde, character from 1992 Moonlite Software computer game Clyde's Adventure and its 1995 sequel Clyde's Revenge
 Clyde, a character in the 2009 video game Arc Rise Fantasia
 Clyde, a character in the book series Tales of an 8-bit Kitten by Cube Kid

See also

 Clyde (surname)
 Clyde (disambiguation)

Masculine given names
English masculine given names